Prior to 1981, the minimum required age to compete in senior events sanctioned by the FIG was 14. The earliest champions in women's gymnastics tended to be in their 20s; most had studied ballet for years before entering the sport. Hungarian gymnast Ágnes Keleti won individual gold medals at the age of 35 at the 1956 Olympics. Larisa Latynina, the first great Soviet gymnast, won her first Olympic all-around medal at the age of 21, her second at 25 and her third at 29; she became the 1958 World Champion while pregnant with her daughter. Czech gymnast Věra Čáslavská, who followed Latynina to become a two-time Olympic all-around champion, was 22 before she started winning gold medals at the highest level of the sport, and won her final Olympic all-around title at the age of 26.

In the 1970s, the average age of Olympic gymnastics competitors began to gradually decrease. While it was not unheard of for teenagers to compete in the 1960s — Ludmilla Tourischeva was sixteen at her first Olympics in 1968 — they slowly became the norm, as difficulty in gymnastics increased.

List of Olympic all-around champions 

Olympic all-around champions 1952–2020- Women
{| class="wikitable sortable"
! width="150px" | Name
! width="50px" | Year
! width="150px" | Date of birth
! width="150px" | Age at Olympics
|-
|  Maria Gorokhovskaya
| align=center | 1952
| align=center | October 27, 1921
| align=center | 
|-
|  Larisa Latynina
| align=center | 1956
| align=center | December 27, 1934
| align=center | 
|-
|  Larisa Latynina
| align=center | 1960
| align=center | December 27, 1934
| align=center | 
|-
|  Věra Čáslavská
| align=center | 1964
| align=center | May 3, 1942
| align=center | 
|-
|  Věra Čáslavská
| align=center | 1968
| align=center | May 3, 1942
| align=center | 
|-
|  Ludmilla Tourischeva
| align=center | 1972
| align=center | July 10, 1952
| align=center | 
|-
|  Nadia Comăneci
| align=center | 1976
| align=center | November 12, 1961
| align=center | 
|-
|  Yelena Davydova
| align=center | 1980
| align=center | August 7, 1961
| align=center | 
|-
|  Mary Lou Retton
| align=center | 1984
| align=center | January 24, 1968
| align=center | 
|-
|  Yelena Shushunova
| align=center | 1988
| align=center | April 23, 1969
| align=center | 
|-
|  Tatiana Gutsu
| align=center | 1992
| align=center | September 5, 1976
| align=center | 
|-
|  Lilia Podkopayeva
| align=center | 1996
| align=center | August 15, 1978
| align=center | 
|-
|  Andreea Răducan
| align=center | 2000
| align=center | September 30, 1983
| align=center | 
|-
|  Carly Patterson
| align=center | 2004
| align=center | February 4, 1988
| align=center | 
|-
|  Nastia Liukin
| align=center | 2008
| align=center | October 30, 1989
| align=center | 
|-
|  Gabrielle Douglas
| align=center | 2012
| align=center | December 31, 1995
| align=center | 
|-
|  Simone Biles
| align=center | 2016
| align=center | March 14, 1997
| align=center | 
|-
|  Sunisa Lee
| align=center | 2020
| align=center | March 9, 2003
| align=center | 
|}

Olympic all-around champions 1952–2020 – Men
{| class="wikitable sortable"
! width="150px" | Name
! width="50px" | Year
! width="150px" | Date of birth
! width="150px" | Age at Olympics
|-
|  Viktor Chukarin
| align=center | 1952
| align=center | November 9, 1921
| align=center | 
|-
|  Viktor Chukarin
| align=center | 1956
| align=center | November 9, 1921
| align=center | 
|-
|  Boris Shakhlin
| align=center | 1960
| align=center | January 27, 1932
| align=center | 
|-
|  Yukio Endo
| align=center | 1964
| align=center | January 18, 1937
| align=center | 
|-
|  Sawao Kato
| align=center | 1968
| align=center | October 11, 1946
| align=center | 
|-
|  Sawao Kato
| align=center | 1972
| align=center | October 11, 1946
| align=center | 
|-
|  Nikolai Andrianov
| align=center | 1976
| align=center | October 14, 1952
| align=center | 
|-
|  Alexander Dityatin
| align=center | 1980
| align=center | August 7, 1957
| align=center | 
|-
|  Koji Gushiken
| align=center | 1984
| align=center | November 12, 1956
| align=center | 
|-
|  Vladimir Artemov
| align=center | 1988
| align=center | December 7, 1964
| align=center | 
|-
|  Vitaly Scherbo
| align=center | 1992
| align=center | January 13, 1972
| align=center | 
|-
|  Li Xiaoshuang
| align=center | 1996
| align=center | November 1, 1973
| align=center | 
|-
|  Alexei Nemov
| align=center | 2000
| align=center | May 28, 1976
| align=center | 
|-
|  Paul Hamm
| align=center | 2004
| align=center | September 24, 1982
| align=center | 
|-
|  Yang Wei
| align=center | 2008
| align=center | February 8, 1980
| align=center | 
|-
|  Kohei Uchimura
| align=center | 2012
| align=center | January 3, 1989
| align=center | 
|-
|  Kohei Uchimura
| align=center | 2016
| align=center | January 3, 1989
| align=center | 
|-
|  Daiki Hashimoto
| align=center | 2020
| align=center | August 7, 2001
| align=center | 
|}

NB: The "age at Olympics" is calculated from the first day of Olympics gymnastics competition, if available; or the date of the Olympics opening ceremonies.

References

Olympic gymnasts
All-around artistic gymnastics